Camajábà is a village in the Gabú Region of north-eastern Guinea-Bissau. It lies to the southwest of Buruntuma and west of Piche.

References

External links
Maplandia World Gazetteer

Populated places in Guinea-Bissau
Gabu Region